Liv-Marit Bergman (born 21 May 1975) is a Swedish pop musician.

Biography 
Marit Bergman grew up in Rättvik, Sweden, and lives in Brooklyn, New York.  She was a member of the 1990s Swedish punk band Candysuck. She has also been playing and recording with other musical groups. However, it is as a solo artist that she has risen to national fame, debuting in 2002 with the album 3.00 A.M. Serenades on her own record company Sugartoy Recordings. The record was a success with the critics and was re-released by RCA/BMG in 2003.  Björn Yttling of Peter Bjorn and John produced the album.

Her second album, Baby Dry Your Eye, was released in 2004 to critical acclaim and commercial success. It was produced by Marco Manieri. The grand arrangements of its pop songs, in a style sometimes compared to Phil Spector, earned Bergman five Swedish Grammis nominations and two awards – Composer of the Year and Female Artist of the Year. In 2005, a live DVD Live at Rival was released.

In 2006, Bergman released her third solo album, I Think It's a Rainbow. It was produced by Bergman and Yttling and earned five Swedish Grammis nominations.

In 2007, she signed an international deal with US indie label Hypnote, while still keeping a licensing deal for Scandinavia with SonyBMG.

She has been touring in Spain, Italy, Germany, France, Norway, Finland, Poland, Denmark, the US and the UK.

In 2008, she launched a subscription service through her website. She also appeared on Swedish producer Kleerup's self-titled album, contributing vocals to the track "3AM".

Her fourth album, The Tear Collector, was released in March 2009, produced by Marit Bergman. Singers like Frida Hyvönen, Jens Lekman and Larkin Grimm appeared on the album.

In 2011, she took part in a competition called Maestro 2011 arranged by SVT (Swedish Television). She won that competition that had as goal to train the participants to conduct a symphony orchestra.

Discography

Albums 
 3.00 A.M. Serenades (2002, re-released in 2003) (DNC)
 Baby Dry Your Eye (2004) (#1)
 I Think It's a Rainbow (2006) (#1)
 The Tear Collector (2009) (#14)
 Molnfabriken (2016) (#56)

Singles and EPs

References 

Interview in Dagens Nyheter, published 7 September 2006 (in Swedish)
Interview in Svenska Dagbladet, published 23 March 2004 (in Swedish)
Interview in Aftonbladet, published 29 December 2004 (in Swedish)

External links 

Official website

Swedish women musicians
1975 births
Living people
Sommar (radio program) hosts
Swedish radio presenters
Swedish-language singers
Artists from Dalarna